Sūr Dās is a crater on Mercury. Its name was adopted by the International Astronomical Union (IAU) in 1979. The crater is named for the Indian poet Surdas.

References

Impact craters on Mercury